Charles de Kermovan de Gouzillon  was a French Navy officer. He served in the War of American Independence.

Biography 
Gouzillon was the first son of his parents. He was brother to Chef de Division Andrée-Marie de Gouzillon de Bélizal, and cousin to Lieutenant Jean-Michel-Guillaume de Gouzillon. Kermovan de Gouzillon joined the Navy as a Garde-Marine on 4 July 1754. 

He was promoted to Lieutenant on 1 February 1770. In 1778, he was the first officer of the 64-gun Éveillé, under Captain du Botderu, in the squadron under Orvilliers.

On 4 April 1780, Gouzillon was promoted to Captain. He commanded the 64-gun Ardent at the Battle of the Saintes, and was wounded several times during the battle.

He retired on 6 March 1785.

Sources and references 
 Notes

Citations

References
 
 
 

External links
 

French Navy officers
French military personnel of the American Revolutionary War